Velimir Stjepanović (Serbian Cyrillic: Велимир Стјепановић; born 7 August 1993) is a Serbian professional swimmer currently representing DC Trident at the International Swimming League. He has won gold medals at the European Championships, European Short Course Championships and Mediterranean Games.

Youth and Junior Career
Born in Abu Dhabi, to Bosnian Serb parents, he chose to represent Serbia in the international swimming competitions. The Serbian youngster started swimming when he was barely six, mainly for fitness. However, by the time he was 12 his path crossed with that of coach Chris Tidey, who had relocated to Dubai from Cambridge. After a brief six-month training regimen under Tidey, Stjepanović won his first medal, a bronze, at a competition in England. He also studied in one of GEMS schools.

Velimir competed at the 2009 European Youth Olympic Festival. He won a gold medal in 100m butterfly and silver in 100m Freestyle. At the 2010 Youth Olympic Games, he was a Serbian flagbearer and won 2 medals, silver in 100m Freestley and bronze in 100m butterfly therefore Olympic Committee of Serbia has declared him the best young athlete in 2010.  Stjepanović won gold medals in the 100m freestyle and 100m butterfly at the 2011 European Junior Swimming Championships.

Senior career

2011 
He represented Serbia at the 2011 World Aquatics Championships in Shanghai, where he competed in 100 and 400n freestyle and 200m butterfly. At the European Short Course Swimming Championships held in Szczecin he came 5th in final of 200m butterfly.

2012 
Stjepanović competed at the 2012 European Aquatics Championships and took 5th place in Men's 200m butterfly Final. At the 2012 Summer Olympics in London, he finished 6th of Men's 200m butterfly Final. In the preliminary round he broke the Serbian national record and qualified for the semi finals with the 3rd time overall.

2013 
At the 2013 Mediterranean Games held in Mersin, Turkey he won the gold medal in 200m and 400m freestyle and 200m butterfly. Stjepanović competed at the 2013 World Aquatics Championships and qualified for the semi final of 200m freestyle and 200m butterfly while he finished 18th in the 400m freestyle.
At the end of the year, Stjepanović won gold medal in 200m butterfly, bronze in 400m freestyle and finished 5th in 200m freestyle at the 2013 European Short Course Swimming Championships.

2014 World Championships (25m) 
At the 2014 FINA Short Course World Championships in Doha, Stjepanovic won a bronze medal in the 400m freestyle. http://www.swimstar2000.net/all/doha/Doha-2014-SRB.htm

International Swimming League 
Stjepanovic was a member of the inaugural International Swimming League (ISL) representing DC Trident. He competed at the first two matches held in Indianapolis, Indiana, and Naples, Italy, as well as in the American Derby held in College Park, Maryland.

Career best times

See also
 List of Serbian records in swimming

References

External links
 
 
 
 
  (archive)
 Velimir Stjepanovic's profile, Swimming Club Partizan, official website 

Serbian male swimmers
Swimmers at the 2010 Summer Youth Olympics
Male butterfly swimmers
Serbian male freestyle swimmers
1993 births
Living people
Sportspeople from Dubai
Serbs of Bosnia and Herzegovina
Swimmers at the 2012 Summer Olympics
Swimmers at the 2016 Summer Olympics
Olympic swimmers of Serbia
European champions for Serbia
Serbian expatriate sportspeople in the United Arab Emirates
Mediterranean Games gold medalists for Serbia
Mediterranean Games silver medalists for Serbia
Swimmers at the 2013 Mediterranean Games
Swimmers at the 2018 Mediterranean Games
Mediterranean Games medalists in swimming
Swimmers at the 2020 Summer Olympics